This is a list of current and former Australian immigration detention facilities. Immigration detention facilities are used to house people in immigration detention, and people detained under the Pacific Solution, and Operation Sovereign Borders.

Most facilities were operated by Australasian Correctional Management (a subsidiary of G4S) under contract from the Department of Immigration until 2003, when ACM exited the market. Between 2003 and 2009, G4S was appointed as the contractor to manage a large number of facilities. Its contract was not renewed and in 2009 Serco Australia was awarded a five-year contract. The offshore processing centres on Nauru and Manus were operated by Broadspectrum (formerly known as Transfield Services), with security sub-contracted to Wilson Security, and later by Canstruct International. The new centres in Lorengau have security by Paladin Group.

References

External links
Department of Immigration and Border Protection: About immigration detention

Immigration detention facilities
Illegal immigration to Australia
Penal system in Australia
 
Immigration detention
Australia
Australian crime-related lists